"Broken Wings" is a song recorded and performed by the band Alter Bridge. The song was the third and final single from the band's debut studio album, One Day Remains. It was not as successful as the previous two singles ("Open Your Eyes" and "Find the Real"). Actor Paul Guilfoyle, known for his role in the hit show CSI: Crime Scene Investigation, appears in the song's music video. The song peaked at number 29 on the Billboard Hot Mainstream Rock Tracks chart.

Chart performance

References

2005 singles
Alter Bridge songs
Songs written by Mark Tremonti
2004 songs
Songs written by Myles Kennedy
Songs written by Scott Phillips (musician)
Songs written by Brian Marshall
Wind-up Records singles